Ifeanyi Festus Ezeli-Ndulue (born October 21, 1989) is a Nigerian-American professional basketball player. He previously played five seasons in the National Basketball Association (NBA). He played college basketball for Vanderbilt before being selected with the 30th overall pick in the 2012 NBA draft by the Golden State Warriors. Ezeli won an NBA Championship with the Warriors in 2015. He last appeared in the 2016 NBA Finals, and did not play basketball since his knee surgery in the 2017 season until coming back in 2021.

Early life

Life in Nigeria
One of five children, Ezeli remembered in a 2011 interview with Andy Katz of ESPN.com, "My parents told me I was an unusual child. My first name is Ifeanyi, and that means 'nothing is impossible with God'. That sets the tone for my journey while I'm alive." He concentrated on academics, graduating from high school while still age 14, and aspiring to become a physician. To further his career goals, his parents sent him to live with his uncle, a pediatrician, in Yuba City, California in 2004.

Life in America
Shortly after Ezeli arrived in Yuba City, his uncle encouraged him to take up what seemed to be the most appropriate sport for a 6'8" (2.03 m) teenager—basketball. This proved much more difficult for him than academics; although he had played soccer as a child, he had never played any organized sports. He took a year of classes at Jesuit High School in Sacramento, but did not play basketball; different sources report that he was either ineligible to play because he had graduated from high school in Nigeria or cut during tryouts. The start of his organized basketball career, with a low-level AAU team, was especially inauspicious; his first points were scored in his own team's basket. Recalling that incident, he said, "Everybody was running up the court, and I was just running with them. It's kind of surreal. Sometimes I think about it now and I'm like, Damn. How did I get here?"

Also in the Katz interview, Ezeli remarked on his struggles to learn the game:"I didn't know what I was doing. Imagine someone who is 14 or 15 years old, and you're teaching them as if they're a 6-year-old. It was tough. Everyone was getting frustrated with me. I was getting frustrated with it. I tried playing in 2005. I stopped. I tried again in 2006. And when I had my first dunk in a summer league game in Las Vegas in 2006, that's when I was so excited. It was so exhilarating that I started to like it."

At age 16, Ezeli joined a second AAU team and also enrolled part-time at Yuba Community College. By not attending full-time, he retained a full four years of college eligibility and was still able to practice with the team; he also served as the team's videographer. Although still learning the most basic of basketball skills, he made his high-level competitive debut on the AAU circuit in the summer of 2007. By then, he had reached 6'11" (2.11 m), and averaged 10 points, 11 rebounds, and 3 blocks per game, earning an invitation to the Reebok All-American Camp in July 2007.

Recruitment
Ezeli's appearance at the camp marked a major turning point in his life. According to Sports Illustrated writer Pablo S. Torre,"Recruiters. . .awaited his arrival as if he were Bigfoot. They left with their heads spinning at Ezeli's size and raw potential, even if it was clear that he lacked confidence. Offers from 27 Division I schools he knew almost nothing about rolled in."

With the help of his AAU coaches, Ezeli narrowed his list to Boston College, Connecticut, Harvard, and Vanderbilt. The Vanderbilt coaching staff sold him on the school, citing its academic reputation and the program's recent experience with international players. Head coach Kevin Stallings added that Ezeli would be able to redshirt his first year at the school to allow him more time to develop, since the program had a highly touted Australian prospect, A. J. Ogilvy, arriving at the same time and playing Ezeli's position.

College career
Ezeli arrived in Nashville in 2007 as a biology major and among the rawest of basketball prospects. During his first two years in the program, while still learning many of the basics of the sport, he was frequently dominated in practice by Ogilvy. However, as early as midway through his redshirt freshman season, the Commodores staff noticed that Ogilvy was beginning to have difficulty scoring against Ezeli in practice. While obsessively studying the game and working on his basic skills, he spent his first two seasons of eligibility primarily as a backup to Ogilvy, occasionally starting, until Ogilvy declared for the NBA draft after the 2009–10 season.

With Ogilvy gone, Ezeli had a breakout season in 2010–11, averaging 13 points and 6.3 rebounds while being named a second-team All-SEC (Southeastern Conference) performer. He also broke Will Perdue's Vanderbilt single-season record for blocked shots. Ezeli's improvement was noted by many in the basketball world; then-Tennessee coach Bruce Pearl told the Chattanooga Times Free Press, "I don't think they miss [Ogilvy] at all. Ezeli has improved so much that he gives them the best of both worlds [offense and defense]." Before the 2011–12 season, Ezeli was also named by Basketball Prospectus in its preseason outlook as one of the top 20 players in men's college basketball, along with teammates John Jenkins and Jeffery Taylor.

As the Commodores were preparing for Ezeli's final season at Vanderbilt, Stallings said about him,"He now has a feel for the game. He has made himself an effective player. I think it's very rare. All of us are looking for more finished products. But we all understood if the payday came, if it really came, if he understood the game, if he was experienced, then it was going to give him a chance to be different than other guys. He didn't learn the game in elementary school like I did. He was trying to learn the game while competing effectively in the SEC. That makes it even more amazing."

NCAA statistics

Professional career

Golden State Warriors (2012–2016)

Ezeli was selected by the Golden State Warriors with the 30th overall pick in the 2012 NBA draft. On July 6, he signed his rookie scale contract with the Warriors. As a rookie in 2012–13, Ezeli started many games for the Warriors in place of injured center Andrew Bogut. On January 19, 2013, Ezeli had a season-best game with 13 points and 8 rebounds in 116–112 win over the New Orleans Hornets.

In June 2013, Ezeli was ruled out for six to nine months after undergoing surgery on his right knee. He subsequently missed the entire 2013–14 season, returning to action for the Warriors in the team's 2014–15 season opener. On December 22, 2014, he scored a then-career-high 15 points in a 128–108 win over the Sacramento Kings. The following day, he sprained his left ankle in a loss to the Los Angeles Lakers and was confined to a moon boot. The injury kept him out all of January, when on January 28, he was assigned to the Santa Cruz Warriors of the NBA Development League for rehabilitation. On February 2, he was recalled by Golden State after successfully competing in two D-League games. The following day, he made his return for Golden State, playing eight minutes of action in a win over the Sacramento Kings. In the 2015 NBA playoffs, Ezeli logged key minutes as the first big man off Golden State's bench, often filling in for the foul-prone Andrew Bogut. The Warriors, with the help of Ezeli, advanced deep into the postseason to win the Western Conference Finals against James Harden and the Houston Rockets in a 4–1 series. Ezeli won his first NBA championship after the Warriors defeated the Cleveland Cavaliers in the 2015 NBA Finals in six games.

On August 1, 2015, Ezeli played for Team Africa at the 2015 NBA Africa exhibition game.

On November 6, 2015, Ezeli scored a career-high 16 points as a starter in a 119–104 win over the Denver Nuggets. The Warriors' NBA-record start ended after 24 wins when they lost to the Milwaukee Bucks 108–95 on December 12. On February 8, 2016, he underwent successful arthroscopic surgery to clean out debris from his left knee and was subsequently ruled out for six weeks. He returned to action on April 3 against the Portland Trail Blazers after missing 31 games. Ezeli helped the Warriors win an NBA record 73 games to eclipse the 72 wins set by the 1995–96 Chicago Bulls. The Warriors made it to the 2016 NBA Finals after overcoming a 3–1 deficit against the Oklahoma City Thunder, winning the Western Conference Finals in seven games.

Westchester Knicks (2021) 
On July 7, 2016, Ezeli signed with the Portland Trail Blazers. On August 23, 2016, he was ruled out for six weeks after undergoing a left knee injection. Two months later, he suffered a minor setback in his comeback from the procedure, with swelling in his left knee. In mid-December, it became apparent to the Trail Blazers that conservative treatment of Ezeli's aching left knee wasn't working, and that season-ending surgery was imminent. On March 8, 2017, he underwent surgery on his left knee and was ruled out for the entire 2016–17 season. On June 30, 2017, he was waived by the Trail Blazers before appearing in a game for them.

On March 2, 2021, Ezeli signed a contract with the Westchester Knicks of the NBA G League, returning to professional basketball after a 4-year hiatus dealing with multiple injuries and difficult recoveries. He was immediately assigned the number 20 jersey. He appeared in two games.

On April 17, 2021, Ezeli signed with Rivers Hoopers to play in the inaugural season of the Basketball Africa League (BAL). However, before playing a single game with the Hoopers, Ezeli got injured and was replaced by Robinson Opong.

NBA career statistics

Regular season 

|-
| style="text-align:left;"| 
| style="text-align:left;"| Golden State
| 78 || 41 || 14.4 || .438 || .000 || .531 || 4.0 || .3 || .3 || .9 || 2.4
|-
| style="text-align:left;background:#afe6ba;"| †
| style="text-align:left;"| Golden State
| 46 || 7 || 11.0 || .547 || .000 || .628 || 3.4 || .2 || .2 || .9 || 4.4
|-
| style="text-align:left;"| 
| style="text-align:left;"| Golden State
| 46 || 13 || 16.7 || .548 || .000 || .530 || 5.6 || .7 || .4 || 1.1 || 7.0
|- class="sortbottom"
| align="center" colspan=2| Career
| 170 || 61 || 14.1 || .513 || .000 || .557 || 4.3 || .4 || .3 || 1.0 || 4.2

Playoffs 

|-
| style="text-align:left;"| 2013
| style="text-align:left;"| Golden State
| 12 || 3 || 11.2 || .462 || .000 || .571 || 2.5 || .2 || .3 || .6 || 2.0
|-
| style="text-align:left;background:#afe6ba;"| 2015†
| style="text-align:left;"| Golden State
| 20 || 0 || 9.2 || .540 || .000 || .552 || 3.1 || .3 || .1 || .5 || 3.5
|-
| style="text-align:left;"| 2016
| style="text-align:left;"| Golden State
| 23 || 1 || 8.8 || .536 || .000 || .432 || 2.7 || .3 || .1 || .3 || 4.0
|-
|- class="sortbottom"
| align="center" colspan=2| Career
| 55 || 4 || 9.5 || .530 || .000 || .500 || 2.8 || .3 || .1 || .4 || 3.4

Personal life
Ezeli has a half-sister named Marie Nkechi Ndulue.

Although Ezeli began his Vanderbilt studies as a biology major, he changed his major to economics because of the time demands of basketball. Vanderbilt chancellor Nicholas Zeppos said of Ezeli: "You can imagine what it's like to hear his perspective on world trade, globalization and the economics of American sports." Ezeli's parents live in Sacramento.

See also

References

External links

 Vanderbilt Commodores bio

1989 births
Living people
Centers (basketball)
Golden State Warriors draft picks
Golden State Warriors players
National Basketball Association players from Nigeria
Nigerian expatriate basketball people in the United States
People from Yuba City, California
Santa Cruz Warriors players
Sportspeople from Benin City
Vanderbilt Commodores men's basketball players